Salvatore Mormile (Naples, November, 1839- ) was an Italian painter, mainly of genre figures and portraits.

Biography

He studied at the Royal Institute of Fine Arts of Naples, where he garnered numerous prizes. He displayed in the 1869 National Exhibition of Naples: Il Savonarola. At the Promotrice of Naples, among his displayed works were: Un exelsior militare and Uno straordinario. He also painted Il mese mariano, and a number of genre scenes, including Le pompeiane dei secolo XIX. 
 It is likely that he was a sibling of the better-known painter, Gaetano Mormile, also born in 1839 and active in Naples.

References

1839 births
19th-century Italian painters
Italian male painters
Italian genre painters
Painters from Naples
Year of death missing
19th-century Italian male artists